Szentgyörgyvár is a village in Zala County, Hungary.

History
The village was first mentioned in 1461. The castle stood along the river Zala at this time, the village bearing the same name was below it. Its defensive role grew during 16th century Turkish attacks. The castle was never conquered by the Turks.

References

External links

Populated places in Zala County